TV Åland is a privately owned local television channel broadcasting mainly in the urban areas of Åland, an autonomous province of Finland.

History
TV Åland began its operations during the fall of 1984, with its first broadcast occurring in September that year. The channel has been operated by several companies during its existence: Ålands Videoproduktion Ab was the principal production company until its bankruptcy in the mid-1990s, at which point Weman Media Ab took over operations. The channel is currently run by TV Åland Productions Ab.

Broadcast
The channel is available via MCA network, Vikingaåsens antennförening and Godby antennförening. Ålcom IPTV also offers a VoD service. Programming has also been distributed via Ålands Radio and TV and local antenna operators throughout Åland.

The channel reaches approximately 80% of the people of Åland.

External links 
 Official website 

Communications in Åland
Mass media in Åland
Television in Åland
Television channels and stations established in 1984
Television channels in Finland